The Kentucky House of Representatives is the lower house of the Kentucky General Assembly. It is composed of 100 Representatives elected from single-member districts throughout the Commonwealth. Not more than two counties can be joined to form a House district, except when necessary to preserve the principle of equal representation. Representatives are elected to two-year terms with no term limits. The Kentucky House of Representatives convenes at the State Capitol in Frankfort.

History
The first meeting of the Kentucky House of Representatives was in Lexington, Kentucky, in 1792, shortly after statehood. During the first legislative session, legislators chose Frankfort to be the permanent state capital.

After women gained suffrage in Kentucky, Mary Elliott Flanery was elected as the first female member of the Kentucky House of Representatives. She took her seat in January 1922, and was the first woman elected to a Southern state legislature.

In 2017, the Republicans became the majority party in the House. They now hold a four-fifths supermajority in the chamber.

Powers and legislative process

Section 47 of the Constitution of Kentucky stipulates that all bills for raising revenue must originate in the state House of Representatives.

Membership

Current composition

Terms and qualifications
According to Section 32 of the Kentucky Constitution, a state representative must:
be a citizen of Kentucky, be at least 24 years old at the time of election, 
have resided in the state at least 2 years and the district at least 1 year prior to election. 
Per section 30 of the Kentucky Constitution, representatives are elected every two years in the November following a regular session of the General Assembly.

Leadership
The speaker of the Kentucky House of Representatives is the chief presiding officer of the Kentucky House. The speaker's official duties include maintaining order in the House, recognizing members during debate, appointing committee chairs and determining the composition of committees, and determining which committee has jurisdiction over which bill. Traditionally, the speaker has also served as chair of the Rules Committee and the Committee on Committees.

When the speaker is absent from the floor or otherwise unavailable, the speaker pro tempore fills in as the chief presiding officer of the House.

In addition to the speaker and speaker pro tem, each party caucus elects a floor leader, a whip, and caucus chair.

Leaders

List of current representatives

Past composition of the House of Representatives

See also
Kentucky Legislature
Kentucky Senate
Government of Kentucky

References

External links
 Legislative Research Commission

Kentucky General Assembly
State lower houses in the United States